Robert Daniel Conlon (born December 4, 1948) is an American prelate of the Roman Catholic Church who served as bishop of the Diocese of Joliet in Illinois from 2011 to 2020. From 2002 to 2011 he served as bishop of the Diocese of Steubenville in Ohio.

Early life and education
Robert Conlon was born on December 4, 1948, in Cincinnati, Ohio, the eldest of the six children of Robert and Carla (née Holzman) Conlon. As a child, he attended St. Mary Church in Hyde Park, Ohio.  Conlon later attended Purcell High School and St. Gregory Seminary High School in Cincinnati, graduating in 1966 from St. Gregory. Conlon then entered the Athanaeum of Ohio in Cincinnati, receiving his degree in 1975.

On March 9, 1974, Conlon was ordained a deacon at the Cathedral Basilica of St. Peter in Chains in Cincinnati.  After receiving his diaconate, Conlon served as a deacon at St. Agnes Parish in Cincinnati.

Ordination and ministry
On January 15, 1977, Conlon was ordained to the priesthood for the Archdiocese of Cincinnati by then Archbishop Joseph Bernardin. After his ordination, Conlon was assigned as associate pastor at Immaculate Heart of Mary Parish in Cincinnati, serving there until July 1982.  In 1981, Conlon also assumed the roles of director of the Office of Planning and Research and assistant chancellor.

In 1983, Conlon entered St. Paul University in Ottawa, Ontario.  He was awarded a Doctorate of Canon Law degree and a philosophy degree in January 1987. After returning to Cincinnati in 1987, Conlon was appointed chancellor and director of the Department of Executive Services for the archdiocese. He would hold these positions until 1996. On August 6, 1996, Conlon became pastor of Holy Redeemer Parish in New Bremen, Ohio.

Bishop of Steubenville
On May 31, 2002, Pope John Paul II appointed Conlon as bishop of the Diocese of Steubenville. He was consecrated on August 6, 2002 by Archbishop Daniel Pilarczyk with Bishops Gilbert Sheldon and Sydney Charles serving as co-consecrators. Conlon took as his episcopal motto: "Take Courage" (Daniel 10:19, John 16:33).

In 2005, Conlon led a group of volunteers to New Orleans to assist the victims of Hurricane Katrina, after hearing Archbishop Alfred Hughes speak about the devastation that Katrina caused in his Archdiocese of New Orleans.

Within the United States Conference of Catholic Bishops, Conlon served as the chair of the Committee for the Protection of Children and Young People from 2011 to 2014.

Bishop of Joliet
On May 17, 2011, Pope Benedict XVI named Conlon as the fifth bishop of the Diocese of Joliet. On July 14, 2011, he was installed at the Cathedral of St. Raymond Nonnatus in Joliet.

In September 2012, Conlon created a controversy by reinstating F. Lee Ryan, a diocese priest, to ministry for homebound parishioners. The diocese had suspended Ryan in 2010 from St. Edmund Parish in Watseka, Illinois, and St. Joseph Mission in Crescent City, Illinois, because it had determined a sexual abuse allegation against Ryan from the 1970s was credible.  According to The Huffington Post, Conlon ruled that since child molestation was not a serious crime under canon law in the 1970s, the diocese could only limit Ryan in ministry and not remove him completely.  After dealing with large opposition within the diocese to this decision, Conlon reversed himself on September 18, 2012, and permanently removed Ryan from ministry.

Conlon wrote his first pastoral letter to the Diocese of Joliet on June 13, 2019, entitled "Go, He Said." In this letter, he wrote of having witnessed "an enormous decline in people's participation in the life of the Church" but that Pope Francis had inspired his attitude. He went on the write that Catholics must prepare to be missionary disciples and there was a great need for the involvement of the lay faithful.

On October 31, 2019, Conlon and the Diocese of Joliet were named in a $100,000 sexual abuse lawsuit. The defendant was a developmentally disabled man who had been sexually assaulted in 2017 at the Shapiro Developmental Center in Kankakee, Illinois. The assailant, Father Richard Jacklin, was arrested for the assault. The lawsuit charged the diocese and Conlon with improper vetting of Jacklin's background and negligent supervision of him.

On December 27, 2019, the Diocese of Joliet announced that Conlon was taking an immediate medical leave of absence.  Bishop Richard Pates was appointed as apostolic administrator of the diocese while Conlon was on medical leave. Conlon's medical condition was not disclosed.

Retirement 
Pope Francis accepted Conlon's letter of resignation as bishop of Joliet on May 4, 2020. In a statement, Conlon said he had found 2019 "challenging":"I experienced a lot of stress and fatigue, which I did not always handle well, along with some serious medical issues, plus the death of my best friend.... I am no longer able to carry the burden of leadership of a large diocese."

References

External links
Roman Catholic Diocese of Joliet
Diocese of Steubenville 

1948 births
Living people
The Athenaeum of Ohio alumni
Religious leaders from Cincinnati
Roman Catholic Archdiocese of Cincinnati
Roman Catholic bishops of Joliet in Illinois
Roman Catholic bishops of Steubenville
21st-century Roman Catholic bishops in the United States
Religious leaders from Ohio